SS Edward Eggleston was an American Liberty ship built in 1943 for service in World War II. Its namesake was Edward Eggleston.

Design 

It was mounted with a 4 in deck gun.

Construction and career 
The keel of the ship was laid on April 20, 1943. A Few months later the California Shipbuilding Corp launched the ship in Los Angeles under the name Edward Eggleston. The ship was transferred to the Soviet Union later that year with the name Novorossiysk. The ship survived World War II unscathed.

The ship was scrapped in 1974.

References

 

Liberty ships
Ships built in California
1943 ships